Hartfield Academy (or simply known as Hartfield) is an independent private school in Rankin County, Mississippi, United States. The school hosts K3–12th and has two campuses, West and East. Hartfield's main west campus, located in Flowood, Mississippi, is home to grades 3rd–12th, and Hartfield's smaller east campus, located in Brandon, Mississippi, is home to grades K3–2nd.

History

Founding
Hartfield Academy was formed after a merger between University Christian School, a private school in Flowood, Mississippi, and Pinelake Christian School, an elementary private school in Brandon, Mississippi, in 2012. Before the merger, University Christian School was also known before as Brandon Academy, established in July 1970 in Brandon, Mississippi, and in August 1990, the name changed from Brandon Academy to University Christian School after moving the school to a new location in Flowood, Mississippi.

Before the school opened its doors, the school went through a transition phase, which the west campus, formerly University Christian School, moved away from its former school identity. After a substantial change in identity, Hartfield was open for school in August 2012. The school was renovated to adopt its new identity. The mascot was changed to the 'Hawks' and colors to garnet and gold.

Major expansion
Hartfield Academy's main west campus was relatively small. The school administration and its Board of Trustees planned a new 45,000-square foot addition, which cost around $9 million. The school ran a capital campaign Undeniably Different for the expansion efforts, which raised nearly $4.5 million, and the expansion included new interactive classrooms, high school administrative offices, IT Help Center, Thomas W. Colbert Theater, a main plaza, Cockrell Administrative Offices, a redesigned dining hall, new athletic equipment, a basketball practice gym, and three labs. Construction began in the summer 2018 and finished before August 2019.

Academics
Hartfield Academy focuses on the mission and vision that every student "fulfill their God-given purpose", and the school exists to help families to prepare their students to purse "the next stage of life." Hartfield holds the five core values: Truth, Excellence, Service, Leadership, and Honor. In 2016, Hartfield and Belhaven University signed an agreement to provide dual-enrollment credit for advanced Hartfield students.

Extracurricular Activities

Athletics
As of 2019, Hartfield Academy provides 24 sports team ranging from junior high football to varsity baseball. These sports are run under the athletic department which sports include cheerleading, dance, football, softball, swimming, basketball, soccer, archery, baseball, track and field, cross country golf, and tennis. Hartfield Academy competes with member schools of Midsouth Association of Independent Schools.

Robotics Team
Hartfield Academy's robotics team Odyssey competes in the Mississippi FIRST Tech Challenge program, which is affiliated with CMSE (Center for Mathematics and Science Education) from the University of Mississippi. In 2019, the robotics team went to FIRST Worlds Championship in Houston, Texas during the Rover Ruckus competition season when the team qualified as one of two Mississippi teams to go. Hartfield has had hosted local FIRST Tech Challenge robotics qualifiers in the past. As of September 2019, Mississippi FIRST Tech Challenge moved its kickoff event to the school as a new location for future kickoffs.

References 

Private high schools in Mississippi
Private middle schools in Mississippi
Private elementary schools in Mississippi
Private K-12 schools in Mississippi
Private schools in the Jackson metropolitan area, Mississippi
Christian schools in Mississippi
Schools in Rankin County, Mississippi